Carlo Bandirola (25 September 1915 – 21 September 1981) was an Italian Grand Prix motorcycle road racer. He had his best years in 1950 then again in 1955 when he finished fifth in the 500cc world championship.

References 

1915 births
1981 deaths
Italian motorcycle racers
500cc World Championship riders
Place of birth missing